Omar Arroyo Sánchez (born April 1, 1992, in Fresnillo, Zacatecas) is a Mexican professional association football (soccer) player who plays for C.D. Tepatitlán de Morelos.

References

External links
 

1992 births
Living people
Mexican footballers
Association football forwards
Club Necaxa footballers
Universidad Autónoma de Zacatecas FC footballers
C.D. Tepatitlán de Morelos players
Atlético Estado de México players
Ascenso MX players
Liga Premier de México players
Tercera División de México players
People from Fresnillo
Footballers from Zacatecas